Alan Khan (born 17 December 1971) is a media and radio personality in South Africa. His talk show, Walk the Talk with Alan Khan on Lotus FM, won "Best News and Actuality Talk Show PBS" at the 2017 Liberty South African Radio Awards. He was inducted into the South African Radio Hall of Fame in 2015. In 2020, Khan was named as one of the Top 5 "Most Bankable Radio Broadcasters" in South Africa.

He is currently the Senior Director of Corporate Affairs at the Durban University of Technology in Durban.
Khan married clinical sociologist Professor Mariam Seedat Khan in March 1997. They met after he had interviewed her on his talk show Capital Live on Capital Radio 604. They have two sons, Nasser and Ameer.

Khan hosted the BRICS International Film Festival Awards in 2019, the African Renaissance Banquet from 2012 to 2019 and the 25th World Travel Awards in 2018. Khan made a cameo appearance as a Festival MC, on the Netflix film Trippin' with the Kandasamys.

Khan was born in Durban, South Africa. Before joining DUT, he was CEO of Jacaranda FM and Deputy Managing Director of East Coast Radio. He was also a presenter on Capital Radio 604 and on East Coast Radio in Durban, presented F1 Powerboat Series on DStv Super Sport and he also co-hosted am2day national breakfast TV on SABC.

References

External links
India South Africa Business Forum
Women & Men Against Child Abuse
Simply Managing Academic Related Tasks

1971 births
Living people
People from Durban
South African people of Indian descent
South African radio presenters
Durban University of Technology alumni
People from eThekwini Metropolitan Municipality